Just Like Gravity is the second studio album recorded by Crosby, Pevar and Raymond (CPR).

Track listing
"Map to Buried Treasure" (David Crosby, Jan Crosby, Jeff Pevar, James Raymond, Andrew Ford, Steve DiStanislao)  – 5:34
"Breathless" (Crosby, Crosby, Pevar, Raymond, Ford, DiStanislao)  – 5:16
"Darkness" (Crosby, Pevar, Raymond) – 3:28
"Gone Forever" (Crosby, Pevar, Raymond) – 6:33
"Eyes Too Blue" (Raymond, Crosby) – 5:10
"Jerusalem" (Raymond) – 5:00
"Kings Get Broken" (Crosby) – 4:10
"Angel Dream" (Crosby, Nash, Raymond) – 6:41
"Katie Did" (Crosby, Jeff Pevar) – 4:02
"Climber" (Crosby) – 6:17
"Coyote King" (Crosby, Crosby, Pevar, Raymond, Ford, DiStanislao) – 5:10
"Just Like Gravity" (Crosby)  – 3:49

Personnel

David Crosby - vocals, acoustic guitar (5, 7, 10, 12), electric guitar (6) 
Jeff Pevar - vocals (1, 3-11), acoustic guitar (1-4, 9, 11), electric guitar (1-4, 7-10), mandolin (5, 10), nylon string guitar (5), 6 & 12 string electric guitars (6) 
James Raymond - vocals (1-11), piano (1-2, 4-5, 7-11), Moog bass (1), marimba (2), synths (2, 4), Hammond organ (3, 8, 9), percussion (4), harmonica (5, 6), acoustic guitar (6)
Steve DiStanislao - drums (1-11), percussion (5, 10, 11), vocals (6, 8)
Andrew Ford - bass (2-5, 7-11)
Jamaica Rafael - pizzicato violin (2)
Leland Sklar - bass (6)
Steve Tavaglione - alto flute (11)

References

2001 albums
CPR (band) albums